The Butterfly's Dream is a 1994 Italian drama film directed by Marco Bellocchio. It was screened in the Un Certain Regard section at the 1994 Cannes Film Festival.

Cast
 Thierry Blanc - Massimo
 Simona Cavallari - La ragazzina
 Nathalie Boutefeu - Anna
 Roberto Herlitzka - Il padre
 Henry Arnold - Carlo
 Anita Laurenzi - La prima vecchia
 Antonio Pennarella - Lo zingaro
 Michael Seyfried - Il regista
 Aleka Paizi - La pastora (as Aleka Paisi)
 Sergio Graziani - L'ortolano
 Carla Cassola - L'a seconda vecchia
 Giusy Frallonardo - Attrice
 Consuelo Ciatti - Attrice nella parte di Natalia
 Patrizia Punzo - Attrice nella parte 
 Viviana Natale - L'autostoppista
 Ketty Fusco - La terza vecchia
 Michel Adatte
 Bibi Andersson - La madre (participation)

References

External links

1994 films
1990s Italian-language films
1994 drama films
Films directed by Marco Bellocchio
Italian drama films
1990s Italian films